Memecylon macrocarpum is a species of plant in the family Melastomataceae. It is endemic to Sri Lanka.

References

Endemic flora of Sri Lanka
macrocarpum
Vulnerable plants
Taxonomy articles created by Polbot